is a city located in Nara Prefecture, Japan. The modern city was founded on April 1, 1954, and is named after the Japanese new religion Tenrikyo, which has its headquarters in the city. As of April 1, 2015, the city has an estimated population of 66,866, and 29,169 households. The population density is 800.61 persons per km2, and the total area is 86.37 km2.

History
Tenri was briefly the capital of Japan during the reign of Emperor Ninken. The life of the Imperial court was centered at Isonokami Hirotaka Palace where the emperor lived in 488–498.

Education
Primary schools
Senzai Elementary School
Idodo Elementary School
Yamanobe Elementary School
Nikaido Elementary School
Tenri Elementary School (Private School)
Yanagimoto Elementary School
Tanbaichi Elementary School
Ichinomoto Elementary School
Fukuzumi Elementary School
Asawa Elementary School
Junior high schools
Kita Junior High School
Minami Junior High School
Fukuzumi Junior High School
Nishi Junior High School
Tenri Junior High School (Private School)
High schools
Soekami High School
Nikaido High School
Tenri High School (Private School)
Tenri Kyoko Gakuen High School
Universities
Tenri University (Private university)
Tenri Health Care University (Private university)

Shrines and temples

Tenrikyo
Tenrikyo Church Headquarters

Shinto
Isonokami Shrine

Transportation

Rail
The central station of Tenri is Tenri Station.
 West Japan Railway Company
 Sakurai Line (Manyō-Mahoroba Line): Ichinomoto Station – Tenri Station – Nagara Station – Yanagimoto Station
 Kintetsu Railway
 Tenri Line: Nikaidō Station – Senzai Station – Tenri Station

Road
Expressways of Japan
Nishi-Meihan Expressway
Keinawa Expressway
Japan National Route 24
Japan National Route 25
Japan National Route 169

Sister cities

 Bauru, Brazil
 La Serena, Chile
 Seosan, South Korea

References

External links

 

 
Tenrikyo
Cities in Nara Prefecture
Former capitals of Japan